George Carnoutsos (born 12 February 1958) is a former field hockey player from New Zealand, who was a member of the national team that finished seventh at the 1984 Summer Olympics in Los Angeles, California. He was born in Christchurch. He currently plays tennis at the Cashmere Tennis Club.

References

External links
 

New Zealand male field hockey players
Olympic field hockey players of New Zealand
Field hockey players at the 1984 Summer Olympics
Field hockey players from Christchurch
1958 births
Living people